Primula rosea, the rosy primrose, is a flowering plant species in the genus Primula, native to the Himalayas.

In cultivation it prefers damp places such as the edge of a pond or stream, in moisture-retentive neutral or acid soil and full or partial sunlight. It has won the Royal Horticultural Society's Award of Garden Merit. 

Rosinidin is an anthocyanidin found in P. rosea.

References

External links

rosea
Plants described in 1834